The 1923 All-Ireland Senior Hurling Championship Final was the 36th All-Ireland Final and the culmination of the 1923 All-Ireland Senior Hurling Championship, an inter-county hurling tournament for the top teams in Ireland. The match was held at Croke Park, Dublin, on 14 September 1924, between Galway and Limerick. The Munster champions lost to the Connacht men on a score line of 7-3 to 4-5.

This was to be Galway's last all-Ireland triumph until 1980.

Match details

Leonard McGrath with three goals was the game's top scorer and Galway were captained by Mick Kenny.

References

1
All-Ireland Senior Hurling Championship Finals
Galway GAA matches
Limerick GAA matches
All-Ireland Senior Hurling Championship Final
All-Ireland Senior Hurling Championship Final, 1923